Miroslava "Mirka" Topinková Knapková (born 19 September 1980) is a Czech rower who competed in single scull.

Knapková was born in 1980 in Brno in Czechoslovakia (since 1993 in the Czech Republic). Her father is Miroslav Knapek. At the 2011 World Rowing Championships, she became world champion in single scull at Lake Bled, Slovenia. She was the winner in the same discipline at the 2012 Summer Olympics. Between 2008 and 2015, she won the European Rowing Championships five times in this boat class.

References

External links
 
 
 
 

1980 births
Living people
Czech female rowers
Sportspeople from Brno
Olympic rowers of the Czech Republic
Rowers at the 2004 Summer Olympics
Rowers at the 2008 Summer Olympics
Rowers at the 2012 Summer Olympics
Rowers at the 2016 Summer Olympics
Olympic gold medalists for the Czech Republic
Olympic medalists in rowing
Medalists at the 2012 Summer Olympics
World Rowing Championships medalists for the Czech Republic